Walking Man is a 1995 sculpture by Jonathan Borofsky, standing  tall and weighing . It is located on the Leopoldstraße in Munich, next to the Munich Re business premises. It was presented to the public on 21 September 1995 by then-head of Re, Hans-Jürgen Schinzler, and then-mayor of Munich, Christian Ude.

After presenting the 25-meter high Man Walking to the Sky sculpture at Documenta 9, Borofsky was one of six artists invited to the competition for Re's new building. The sculpture was initially created in Los Angeles, and took more than a year to complete. It was shipped to Munich in nine pieces. The work has been well received by the press and is popular with the public.

References

External links

1995 establishments in Germany
1995 sculptures
Outdoor sculptures in Germany
Arts in Munich
Sculptures of men in Germany
Statues in Germany